Lopud is a small island off the coast of Dalmatia, southern Croatia. Lopud is economically the most developed of the Elaphiti Islands, and can be reached by boat from Dubrovnik, Trsteno, Orašac and Zaton. The island is famous for its sandy beaches, in particular the bay of Šunj. Lopud is the second largest island of the Elaphiti islands, between Koločep and Šipan. It is famous as the "island in the middle" (Insula Media, or Mezzo).

History 
The central island known as Elaphite (Deer) archipelago 7 NM away from Dubrovnik and with an area of 4.6 square km was a frequent station of ancient Greeks and later Romans. There is no substantial proof, but the Greek name Delaphodia for present Lopud as well as Igalo for the waterfront (promenade) confirms the early presence of Greeks on the island. In the 9th century the island was inhabited by Croats, a fact supported by four old Croatian churches and a bulk of archeological finds. Very early (prior to 10th century) it becomes part of Commune of Dubrovnik and immediately upon the establishment of the Republic of Ragusa it makes part of it. Due to its central location Lopud gets the name of Isola di Mezzo. The 15th and 16th centuries were the Golden Age for the island. Thanks to the prospering shipping industry and sea trade (even with Americas) as well as shipbuilding and agriculture the island was a highly cultured one. The well-educated monks of the Franciscan (1483) and Dominican (1482) monasteries made way for literacy on the island. In addition to elementary school the Dominican had the first three grades of high school in their curriculum. It is generally considered that the island's seamen received the basic knowledge in navigation they were to use during their successful voyages. Places and mansions were erected. The names of Lopud streets, as well as its many houses and over thirty churches and chapels tell stories of town of Lopud.

The Ragusa Republic was reinforced by the island's eighty ship merchant fleet both in war and in peace. Writers and poets alike were so impressed with Lopud at that period that they presented it as a city with population of 14 thousand. The history of Lopud regrettably has not been explored thoroughly. However, judging by currently available documents the island at its peak had around 2 thousand inhabitants. For comparison, in 2010 only 200 people inhabit the island. From the 17th century on, its economic power began to decline along with its population. In the last three centuries the island's population fluctuated between 600 and 350. In 1990's 284 people lived on the island. Conquest of Napoleon in 1808 brought end to monasteries' activities. During the Astro-Hungarian rule, Lopud people subsisted on fishery, agriculture, sailing on merchant ships and working abroad, particularly in USA.

In addition to the basic local occupations, the 19th and the beginning of the 20th centuries introduced waving production. with over 50 looms, Lopud turns into an industry center for the area. This trade represents emancipation of Lopud women too. The whole area today covered with vegetation, only 80 years ago was cultivated and covered by olive-groves (19 olive mills).

From 1927-1990 tourism made its mark and the island's population enjoyed a safe and stable period. After WWII all private owned hotels were confiscated and become state property. In the last few years, hotel's buildings of "Hoteli Lopud" enterprise has taken on 90 permanent employees and during summer seasons hire more. The raised standard of living saw construction of newly built stone houses and flats in Dubrovnik. During the aggression against the Republic of Croatia from 1991-1995  business was operated in war conditions and enterprise going bankrupt as a consequence. The so-called privatization, the sell-off the hotels and real estate, as well as devastation, unemployment and job insecurity led to population decrease and young Lopud people had to look for life opportunities elsewhere. Despite the natural resources and potentiality of comfortable life, since 1992 Lopud has been passing the saddest period in its long history.

Gallery

References

Further reading

External links